The Mid-Kent line (also referred to as the Hayes line by train operators, official bodies and the general public) is a British railway line running from Courthill Loop North junction (just south of Lewisham station) to Hayes railway station in the London Borough of Bromley. Despite its name, none of the line is in the present-day county of Kent.

Description
Services commence at either  via , or Cannon Street.
London Bridge – North Kent Junction, Bermondsey: The pioneer London and Greenwich Railway opened its line on 8 February 1836. This section is built on a brick viaduct
North Kent Junction – : opened 30 July 1849 as the North Kent Railway, now called the North Kent line. Most of the railway here is in cutting with the four tracks passing through St Johns railway station, the two northernmost leading into Lewisham station.
Lewisham – : opened 1 January 1857 as the Mid-Kent line. This opening created a junction at Lewisham. 
New Beckenham – : opened on 1 April 1864 as part of an extension of the Mid-Kent line to 
Elmers End – Hayes: this section was built by the West Wickham & Hayes Railway, but was sold to the South Eastern Railway on opening day, 29 May 1882

Services 
All services along the line are operated by Southeastern.

History

Early years 1857–1922
The existing Mid-Kent line consists of three sections built at different times.

The line diverged from the 1857 line to the west of Beckenham Junction and a new station was built in the junction area. This was re-located northwards two years later.

In September 1866 a short spur was opened from the north end of Ladywell station to the recently opened South Eastern Main Line avoiding Lewisham station, which it joins at Parks Bridge Junction.

The Elmers End – Hayes section was built by the West Wickham & Hayes Railway, but was sold to the South Eastern Railway in 1881, opening on 29 May 1882.

Clock House station was opened in June 1890.

In 1898 the South Eastern Railway and its bitter rivals the London Chatham and Dover Railway agreed to work as one railway company under the name of the South Eastern and Chatham Railway and thus the stations became an SECR stations.

The original Lower Sydenham station was closed and moved half a mile south in 1906 in an attempt to develop a new area for housing.

On 14 June 1913 members of the Suffragettes movement planted a bomb which was discovered in the ladies waiting room at Eden Park railway station. The clockwork mechanism had stopped working and so it didn't go off. This event followed the death of Emily Wilding Davison six days earlier after her attempt to stop the King's horse at The Derby.

Southern Railway 1923–1947
Following the Railways Act 1921 (also known as the Grouping Act), the Mid-Kent line came under the control of the Southern Railway. The line was electrified with other SECR suburban routes in 1926.

Hayes, West Wickham and Elmers End stations were all damaged by enemy bombs during the Second World War.

British Railways 1948–1994
After World War II and following nationalisation on 1 January 1948, the line became part of British Railways Southern Region.

In 1956 platform lengths were extended to accommodate 10-car trains.

During the 1960s the local goods yards at Catford Bridge, Lower Sydenham, Clock House, Elmers End, West Wickham and Hayes all closed as did the gas works internal railway at Lower Sydenham.

Colour light signalling was introduced south of Ladywell (as far as New Beckenham) on 4 April 1971. The line was fully converted to colour light operation in September 1975 under the control of London Bridge Signalling Centre. The old mechanical signal boxes closed at this time.

Upon sectorisation in 1982, the line came under the control of the London & South East sector, which was renamed Network SouthEast in 1986.

Goods services were withdrawn in 1964 with the exception of Beckenham Junction which survived until 1982.

During the planning of the London Underground Fleet line, now the Jubilee line, it was suggested that the Mid-Kent line be taken over. However a more northerly alignment was instead taken. The section from Elmers End to Addiscombe was closed in 1997 and taken over by Tramlink operations.

Future plans

Since the late 2000s, Transport for London (TfL) has been planning an extension of the Bakerloo line from Elephant & Castle to Lewisham via Old Kent Road. Following completion of the Lewisham extension, TfL proposes extending the line over the existing National Rail line to Hayes and Beckenham Junction, adding an additional 10 stations to the line. The line would have to be converted for the Bakerloo line, with TfL stating that all stations along the line would be made step-free from street to train. Bromley Council are supportive of the extension to Lewisham, but do not support the extension to Hayes and Beckenham Junction.

Due to the financial situations resulting from the COVID-19 pandemic, work to implement the extension is currently on hold. In March 2021, TfL's finance chief stated that the extension would not be seen in the next decade.

References

Transport in the London Borough of Lewisham
Transport in the London Borough of Bromley
Railway lines opened in 1857
Railway lines in London
Standard gauge railways in London
1857 establishments in England